Strictly speaking, Lai are the people belonging to the Lai Autonomous District Council of Mizoram.  Outside this area they are scattered in Mizoram and many Lai people in Mizoram more than LADC area Lai people outside LADC area some Lai people prefer the name Pawi. Some state they are same as Lusei, North-East India, Hakha, Thantlang, and Falam of Chin State, Myanmar. Lai people can also be found outside their main dominant area. From a historical point of view, Lai is one of a dominant tribe of the so-called Chin-Kuki-Mizo, the community is scattered in different parts of the world, mainly concentrating in Mizoram (Khuafo and Thlantlang/Tuichhak Pawih), Chin Hills (Hakha, Thantlang, Webulah, Zokhua, Keiphaw, Falam) of Burma, South Bangladesh (identified as Bawm {Bawmzo, Bawmlai, Panghawi, Ramthar, and Sunthla)
.

Demography
The total population of the group was around 1,700,000 in 1991. The name Laimi often refers to Chin people who live in the Chin Hills or Central Chin which are Hakha, Thantlang, Falam, etc.

Chin States 

Chin state is 13,907 square miles. Border by Sagaing Division to the east, Magway Division to the south-east, Rakhine State to the south, and Mizoram to the west. According to the 2014 Myanmar population and housing census the population of Chin state is about 478,801, 47.95% male, and 52.05% female. Hakha is the capital city of Chin state and there are nine townships: Hakha, Htantlang, Falam, Tiddim, Tonzang, Matupi, Mindat, Kanpalet, and Paletwa. Each township have their own subtribe and there are about 53 subtribes. There are about 45 dialect of the Chin language. Of these, the most widely spoken dialects are estimated and they are:

 Zomi 344,000 speakers
 Falam Chin an estimated 107,300 speakers
 Hakha Chin 125,000 speakers
 Matu Chin 100,000 speakers

"Each dialect is so distinct that people who speak different dialects will not likely understand each other".

Ethnic origin

The Lai who are living in the Lai Autonomous District of Mizoram are a segmented community of the much larger Lai population of Burma and elsewhere to whom whatever name may be given. They share common ancestry with many other tribes in Northeast India. Further back, a historic tradition has it that Lai people had once lived in China. They migrated through the Tibetan mountains moving further towards the East to become a major tribal group in the Chin Hills of Burma from where same few came to the present habitat (Mizoram) in the beginning of the 18th century or earlier. They are also considered black, because of there origin and some believe lai were also part black in the early 18 century. Which they are to be considered "Half-Lai and Half-black".

The Lai are also believed to be from the main tree of the Qin Dynasty. It is also said that the word Shendoo or Shendu, which was frequently used to denote the Lakher (Mara) in the British records, were said to be the offspring of Lai. F. Chhawnmanga, a retired District Adult Education Officer, under the State Government of Mizoram, who has conducted an extensive personal interview with some chiefs of Lakher, tells.
The Lakher chief Mr. Kilkhara of Saiha and Tawngliana of Serkawr Villages were the descendants of Lianchi and Alkheng respectively of Hlawnchhing family of Hakha. They spoke Lai language. However, after coming down to Mizoram, their names were translated into Lakher dialect and themselves Kikhaw and Thylai.
The above arguments seem to be supported by the statement of Vumson, thus:
They are the same people as Shendoo to whom Col. Lewin made constant reference in his various works and are still called Shendoo by the Arakanis.
There are many common clan names like Hlawnchhing, Chinzah, Khenglawt, Thianhlun, etc. which are found between the Lai and Maras. This is an indication of the fact that Lai and Mara were the same people.
Apart from the above-mentioned groups, there are other linguistic groups that were found to have the same culture and customs, speak a similar language with the Lai. These groups do qualify for Lai in terms of social, cultural and linguistic. Those groups are Bawm and Tlanglau living in the western part of Mizoram and Bangladesh.

Tribes 
There are many tribes among the Chin people which includes Laimi, Matu, Asho, Cho (Sho), Khuami (M'ro), lusei (Lushai), Kuki (Thadou) and Zomi . In each of these tribe group there are many sub-tribes groups. The sub-tribes of Laimi are: Laizo, Khuangli, Khualsim, Zahau, Zanngiat, Lente, Ngawn, Tlanglau, Dawn, Thlanrawn, Tlaisun, Hauhulh, Zokhua, Simhrin, Mi-E, Thawr (Torr), Bawmzo, and Pawih.

Culture

Chin National Day 
Chin National day is celebrated each year on 20 February to commemorate the "General Assembly of Chinland" held in 1948. The first Chin National day was held on 20 February 1951 in Mindat Town and was attended by U Nu, the first Prime Minister.
During the holiday, people from different ethic group display Rua Khua Tlak (bamboo dance), Khuang Cawi (lifting of decorative bamboo lifter), Sarlam (dance of the conquest), Rallu lam (Mizo dance) and many other dances and events. Some of the big events are fashion show, Miss competition and Laipaih (wrestling). The strongest laipaih or Chin wrestler from this generation is Rung Lian Ceu, he was from Chuncung town, and he is currently living in the United States.

Clothing 
There are many different traditional clothing such as Matu, Hakha, Htantlang, Falam, Zophei, Zotung, Zo, Mindat etc. Every kind is uniquely colorful and different. Most traditional dresses’ colors are black and red. There are also accessories that are usually worn with the clothing such as necklaces, bracelets and hairpins. Chin people or Laimi do not wear them on a daily basis. They wear these traditional clothing on special occasions such as Chin National Day, Sundays, Christmas and wedding.

Greeting 
The normal handshake is a common greeting in Chin cultures

Sports 
The most common sports for the Laimi are soccer (football), volleyball, and wrestling.

Religion 
The first Christian missionaries were Arthur Carson and his wife Laura arrived Hakha on 15 March 1899. Today, the majority of Chin are Christian.

References

Kuki tribes
Ethnic groups in Northeast India
Scheduled Tribes of Manipur
Ethnic groups in South Asia